The Battle of the Weldon Railroad refers to two actions in Virginia during the American Civil War:
 The Battle of Jerusalem Plank Road, also known as the First Battle of the Weldon Railroad
 The Battle of Globe Tavern, also known as the Second Battle of the Weldon Railroad